Vecherniy Brest is a bilingual regional socio-political government-run weekly newspaper, published in Brest on Friday (circulation 5000 (January 2021)).

References

Literature
 David Marples: 'Our Glorious Past': Lukashenka's Belarus and the Great Patriotic War, 2014, pp. 25, 42, 331, 340–342.
 Tatiana Repkova: New Times: Making a Professional Newspaper in an Emerging Democracy, 2001, pp. 74.

1991 establishments in Belarus
Publications established in 1991
Mass media in Brest, Belarus
Russian-language newspapers published in Belarus